Olymp may refer to:

Deutscher Olymp, hill in Cuxhaven, Germany
RC Olymp, Ukrainian rugby union club 
IL Molde-Olymp, Norwegian sports club

See also
Olimp (disambiguation)